Kammanu was a Luwian speaking Neo-Hittite state in a plateau (Malatya Plain) to the north of the Taurus Mountains and to the west of Euphrates river in the late 2nd millennium BC, formed from part of Kizzuwatna after the collapse of the Hittite Empire. Its principal city was Melid.

References

See also

Ancient regions of Anatolia

 
Syro-Hittite states